Symphonia globulifera, commonly known as boarwood, is a timber tree abundant in Central America, the Caribbean, South America and Africa. This plant is also used as a medicinal plant and ornamental plant.

Common names
Common trade names of the wood of the Symphonia globulifera are: chewstick, chestick, manni, manil, azufre, and Árbol de Leche Maria.

Distribution
Symphonia globulifera is abundant in the Americas (from Mexico and the Caribbean south to Ecuador) and Africa (from Liberia east to Uganda and south to Angola).

Population genetics
S. globulifera is highly structured across Mesoamerica and the Caribbean, while the eastern foothills of the Andes show little diversity.

See also
 List of plants of Amazon Rainforest vegetation of Brazil

References

External links

globulifera
Trees of Mexico
Trees of South America
Trees of Africa